Psychoactive drugs, such as caffeine, amphetamine, mescaline, lysergic acid diethylamide (LSD), marijuana, chloral hydrate, theophylline, IBMX and others, can have strong effects on certain animals. It is believed that plants developed caffeine as a chemical defense against insects.

Invertebrates

Spiders
In 1948, Swiss pharmacologist Peter N. Witt started his research on the effect of drugs on spiders. The initial motivation for the study was a request from his colleague, zoologist H. M. Peters, to shift the time when garden spiders build their webs between 2 a.m. and 5 a.m., which apparently annoyed Peters, to earlier hours. Witt tested spiders with a range of psychoactive drugs, including amphetamine, mescaline, strychnine, LSD, and caffeine, and found that the drugs affect the size and shape of the web rather than the time when it is built. At small doses of caffeine (10 µg/spider), the webs were smaller; the radii were uneven, but the regularity of the circles was unaffected. At higher doses (100 µg/spider), the shape changed more, and the web design became irregular. All the drugs tested reduced web regularity except for small doses (0.1–0.3 µg) of LSD, which increased web regularity.

The drugs were administered by dissolving them in sugar water, and a drop of solution was touched to the spider's mouth. In some later studies, spiders were fed with drugged flies. For qualitative studies, a well-defined volume of solution was administered through a fine syringe. The webs were photographed for the same spider before and after drugging.

Witt's research was discontinued, but it became reinvigorated in 1984 after a paper by J.A. Nathanson in the journal Science, which is discussed below. In 1995, a NASA research group repeated Witt's experiments on the effect of caffeine, benzedrine, marijuana and chloral hydrate on European garden spiders. NASA's results were qualitatively similar to those of Witt, but the novelty was that the pattern of the spider web was quantitatively analyzed with modern statistical tools, and proposed as a sensitive method of drug detection.

Other arthropods and molluscs
In 1984, Nathanson reported an effect of methylxanthines on larvae of the tobacco hornworm. He administered solutions of finely powdered tea leaves or coffee beans to the larvae and observed, at concentrations between 0.3 and 10% for coffee and 0.1 to 3% for tea, inhibition of feeding, associated with hyperactivity and tremor. At higher concentrations, larvae were killed within 24 hours. He repeated the experiments with purified caffeine and concluded that the drug was responsible for the effect, and the concentration differences between coffee beans and tea leaves originated from 2–3 times higher caffeine content in the latter. Similar action was observed for IBMX on mosquito larvae, mealworm larvae, butterfly larvae and milkweed bug nymphs, that is, inhibition of feeding and death at higher doses. Flour beetles were unaffected by IBMX up to 3% concentrations, but long-term experiments revealed suppression of reproductive activity.

Further, Nathanson fed tobacco hornworm larvae with leaves sprayed with such psychoactive drugs as caffeine, formamidine pesticide didemethylchlordimeform (DDCDM), IBMX or theophylline. He observed a similar effect, namely inhibition of feeding followed by death. Nathanson concluded that caffeine and related methylxanthines could be natural pesticides developed by plants as protection against worms: Caffeine is found in many plant species, with high levels in seedlings that are still developing foliage, but are lacking mechanical protection; caffeine paralyzes and kills certain insects feeding upon the plant. High caffeine levels have also been found in the soil surrounding coffee bean seedlings. It is therefore understood that caffeine has a natural function, both as a natural pesticide and as an inhibitor of seed germination of other nearby coffee seedlings, thus giving it a better chance of survival.

Coffee berry borers seem to be unaffected by caffeine, in that their feeding rate did not change when they were given leaves sprayed with caffeine solution. It was concluded that those beetles have adapted to caffeine. This study was further developed by changing the solvent for caffeine. Although aqueous caffeine solutions had indeed no effect on the beetles, oleate emulsions of caffeine did inhibit their feeding, suggesting that even if certain insects have adjusted to some caffeine forms, they can be tricked by changing minor details, such as the drug solvent.

These results and conclusions were confirmed by a similar study on slugs and snails. Cabbage leaves were sprayed with caffeine solutions and fed to Veronicella cubensis slugs and Zonitoides arboreus snails. Cabbage consumption reduced over time, followed by the death of the molluscs. Inhibition of feeding by caffeine was also observed for caterpillars.

Mammals

Elephants

"Tusko" was the name of a male Indian elephant at the Oklahoma City Zoo. On August 3, 1962, researchers from the University of Oklahoma injected (human use involves oral ingestion) 297 mg of LSD to him, which is nearly three thousand times the human recreational dose. Within five minutes he collapsed to the ground and one hour and forty minutes later he died. It is believed that the LSD was the cause of his death, although some speculate that the drugs the researchers used in an attempt to revive him may have contributed to his death.
In 1984 psychologist Ronald K. Siegel repeated the experiment with two elephants, using LSD only. Both survived.

Dolphins
Bottlenose dolphins were administered LSD in the 1960s as part of NASA-funded experiments by John C. Lilly to study human–animal communication. The drug caused the animals to become more vocal, but did not enable meaningful communication.

Macaque monkeys
Macaque monkeys administered with the antipsychotics haloperidol and olanzapine over a 17–27 month period showed reduced brain volume. These results have not been observed in humans who also take the drug, due to the lack of available data.

Fish

Zebrafish 
Zebrafish have long acted as a model for humans to test the effects of various psychoactive substances. One study conducted by the Research Society on Alcoholism concluded that when given a moderate dose of ethanol, zebrafish became more active and swam faster. When the dose of alcohol increased, the zebrafish became sluggish. Another study by the same institute found that when a "drunk" (blood alcohol concentration of over 0.1) zebrafish is introduced to a group of sober ones, the sober fish will follow the drunk individual as their leader.

In a study testing the effects of THC on memory in zebrafish, researchers found that THC impairs spatial memory but has no effect on associative memory. Zebrafish were able to remember color patterns associated with them getting fed after being put under the influence of THC, but were unable to remember the spatial pattern associated with them getting fed after being put under the influence of THC.

Zebrafish have also been used to test the medicinal benefits of certain psychoactive drugs, particularly how they can be used to treat mental health problems. A study looking into the antidepressant properties of ketamine using zebrafish as subjects found that when exposed to small amounts of ketamine (2 mg/L), zebrafish displayed more aggressive behavior. However, when the zebrafish were exposed to higher doses of ketamine (20 mg/L & 40 mg/L), their aggressive behavior subsided. Moreover, the highest dose of ketamine increased locomotion and circling behavior. In another study testing the behavioral effects of LSD on zebrafish found that zebrafish that were exposed to the substance demonstrated increased inter-fish distance when shoaling, and had increased cortisol levels. These could show possible side effects of LSD if used as a therapeutic drug.

Nile Tilapia 
A study conducted by the Aquaculture Institute looked into the effects of cannabis oil on the metabolism and immune system of the Nile tilapia (Oreochromis niloticus). They found that cannabis has no measurable effect on the white blood cell count or plasma protein concentration, and therefore has no effect on the immune system of the Nile tilapia. However, the tilapia that were fed food pellets laced with THC demonstrated a higher food conversion rate. This higher food conversion rate lead researchers to believe that THC increases the metabolic rate of Nile tilapia.

Further reading 
 Siegel, Ronald K. (1989, 2005) Intoxication: The Universal Drive for Mind-Altering Substances

See also
Rat park
Venom resistant animals

References

External links
Nets made by spiders fed on drug-dosed flies

Effects of psychoactive drugs
Animal cognition
Animal testing